François-Henri Pinault (born ) is a French businessman, the chairman and CEO of Kering since 2005, and president of Groupe Artémis since 2003. Under his leadership, the retail conglomerate PPR was transformed into the luxury fashion group Kering.

Pinault is the son of François Pinault, the founder of PPR. He has been married to Salma Hayek since 2009, and they have a daughter together.

Biography

Family
François-Henri Pinault is the son of François Pinault, the founder of Pinault SA, which later became Pinault-Printemps-Redoute, then PPR, and then Kering.

Pinault was married to Dorothée Lepère from 1996 to 2004. They had two children together, son François (b. 1998) and daughter Mathilde (b. 2001). He dated supermodel Linda Evangelista from September 2005 to January 2006. They had a son together, Augustin James Evangelista (b. October 2006).

In April 2006, he started dating actress Salma Hayek. Their daughter Valentina was born on 21 September 2007. The couple got married on 14 February 2009 in Paris. In April 2009, they renewed their wedding vows in Venice.

Education
Pinault graduated from HEC School of Management in 1985. During his studies, he co-founded the CRM company Soft Computing with other fellow students and did an internship at Hewlett-Packard in Paris as a database-software developer. After graduating, he completed military service in the French Consulate in Los Angeles, and was in charge of studying fashion and new technology sectors.

Early career
In 1987, Pinault began his career at PPR (then called Pinault Distribution) where he was promoted manager of the buying department in 1988, head manager of France Bois Industries in 1989, and head manager of Pinault Distribution in 1990.

In the 1990s, as Pinault Distribution became PPR, an international player in the retail sector, Pinault became president of CFAO in 1993 and CEO of Fnac in 1997. In May 2003, Pinault became vice-president of PPR and president of Groupe Artémis, PPR's parent company.

President and CEO of Kering

In March 2005, Pinault became the President and CEO of PPR and engaged in its transformation into an international group focused on luxury fashion. He offloaded PPR's leading retail assets (Conforama, CFAO, Printemps, Fnac and La Redoute) and merged PPR  with the Gucci group, its subsidiary since 1999, bringing Gucci's luxury portfolio (Gucci, Yves Saint-Laurent, Bottega Veneta, Balenciaga, Boucheron, Alexander McQueen and Stella McCartney) under his direct supervision. He expanded the group's portfolio of luxury brands (Girard-Perregaux, Brioni, Qeelin, Pomellato, Christopher Kane, Tomas Maier, Ulysse Nardin), and in June 2013, he changed PPR's name to Kering. The new name is a reference to his Breton roots, "Ker" meaning "home" in the region's dialect, and sounds like "caring".

Pinault strongly committed his group to sustainable development. In the early 2010s, he implemented the "environmental profit and loss" (EP&L) accounting method, in line with the UN's Sustainable Development Goals, that was gradually applied to all the brands owned by the group. He launched the Kering Foundation in 2008 to support women's rights, and the Women in Motion program with the Cannes Film Festival in 2015 to raise awareness around women-related issues in the film industry. In 2009, he financed the documentary Home by Yann Arthus-Bertrand, which shows aerial shots of various places on Earth and discusses how humanity is threatening the ecological balance of the planet. In January 2018, Kering was named top sustainable textile, apparel and luxury goods corporation in the Corporate Knights Global 100 index. Pinault was mandated by the French President Emmanuel Macron to set up the Fashion Pact during the G7 summit in August 2019, an initiative signed by 56 fashion firms committing to follow concrete measures to reduce their environmental impact.

From 2003 to 2014, PPR's sales had dropped by more than a half, but its profits grew by 40%. From 2005 to 2017, the luxury revenues of the group rose from 3 to 10 billion euros. In 2018, as revenues grew 27% to 15.5 billion euros the year before, he announced his plan to outperform Louis Vuitton with Gucci over time.

In 2018, Pinault confirmed Kering's exit of the Sport & Lifestyle sector to focus solely on the Luxury sector.

Groupe Artémis

Since 2003, Pinault has been the President of Groupe Artémis, the parent company of Kering, and owner of the winery Château Latour, the auction house Christie's, and the football team Stade Rennais F.C. (Ligue 1). Artémis also invested in the cruise ship operator Compagnie du Ponant in 2015.

Artémis also controls Pinault Collection. In 2016, Pinault introduced the project to renovate the  Bourse de Commerce building in Paris and turn it into a Pinault Collection-branded contemporary art museum. To foster Artémis' investments in the technology sector, Pinault launched the $100-million investment fund Red River West in 2017. In 2019, he celebrated the first Coupe de France victory of the Stade Rennais F.C. since its acquisition by the Pinault family in 1998.

Through Artémis, the Pinault family donated $113 million to repair the Notre-Dame de Paris after the 2019 fire.

Main roles
 President and CEO of Kering
 Manager of Financière Pinault
 President of Groupe Artémis
 Co-founder and member of the board of Soft Computing
 Owner of Stade Rennais, a French Ligue 1 football club
 Member of the management board of Château Latour
 Member of the board of Christie's

Awards and honours
 2006: Chevalier de la Légion d'Honneur
 2016: Vanity Fair Hall of Fame
 2018: #8 Businessperson of the Year by Fortune
 2019: Among the "30 best CEO of the world" according to Barron's
 2019 : 3rd of the "100 best CEOs worldwide" according to Harvard Business Review
 2020: Fiorino d'Oro, the highest award of the city of Florence

References

External links 
 Official biography

French businesspeople in fashion
French chairpersons of corporations
French chief executives
1962 births
Living people
French billionaires
French art collectors
21st-century French philanthropists
French investors
Chevaliers of the Légion d'honneur
Christie's people
HEC Paris alumni
Kering people
Businesspeople from Rennes
20th-century French businesspeople
21st-century French businesspeople
François-Henri